Libya–Yemen relations refer to the current and historical relationship of the Libya and Yemen. Libya has an embassy in Sana'a, while Yemen has an embassy in Tripoli. Both the countries have many cultural proximities and are members of the Non-Aligned Movement, Arab League, Council of Arab Economic Unity, Organisation of Islamic Cooperation (OIC) and the UN.

History

References

Yemen
Bilateral relations of Yemen